The winners of the 2000–01 Asian Cup Winners' Cup, the association football competition run by the Asian Football Confederation, are listed below.

First round

West Asia

|}
1 Al Safa withdrew

East Asia

|}

Second round

West Asia

|}

East Asia

|}

Quarterfinals

West Asia

|}

East Asia

|}

Semifinals

Third place match

Final

References
Asian Cup Winners Cup 2001

Asian Cup Winners' Cup
2001 in Asian football
2000 in Asian football